Brave Murder Day is Katatonia's second full-length album, released on 1 August 1996 by Avantgarde Music. The album created a new guitar position with Fredrik Norrman's input and features growled vocals by Mikael Åkerfeldt of Opeth.

The original version of the record was not mastered, but the 2006 Peaceville Records re-release finally released a mastered version of the album and included the Sounds of Decay EP as bonus tracks. The remastered edition also includes new liner notes by Anders Nyström. The previous Century Black reissue of the album included the four tracks from the band's For Funerals to Come... EP. A vinyl release was issued through the band's Northern Silence Productions.

Track listing 
All lyrics written by Jonas Renkse, all music composed by Katatonia.

Personnel 
The list of personnel involved in this album, as it appears in the booklet:
Band
 Mikael Åkerfeldt — lead vocals (except track 3)
 Anders Nyström — bass
 Fredrik Norrman — guitars
 Jonas Renkse — drums, backing vocals, lead vocals on track 3

Production
 Dan Swanö — engineering
 Bildhuset — front and back cover photos
 Lennart Kaltea — photos
 Tom — digital design

Notes

References 

Katatonia albums
1996 albums
Avantgarde Music albums
Blackened death metal albums